Abū ʿAbdillāh Muḥammad ibn Idrīs al-Shāfiʿī (767–19 January 820 CE) was an Arab Muslim theologian, writer, and scholar, who was one of the first contributors of the principles of Islamic jurisprudence (Uṣūl al-fiqh). Often referred to as 'Shaykh al-Islām', al-Shāfi‘ī was one of the four great Sunni Imams, whose legacy on juridical matters and teaching eventually led to the formation of Shafi'i school of fiqh (or Madh'hab). He was the most prominent student of Imam Malik ibn Anas, and he also served as the Governor of Najar. Born in Gaza in Palestine (Jund Filastin), he also lived in Mecca and Medina in the Hejaz, Yemen, Egypt, and Baghdad in Iraq.

Introduction 
The biography of al-Shāfi‘i is difficult to trace. Dawud al-Zahiri was said to be the first to write such a biography, but the book has been lost. The oldest surviving biography goes back to Ibn Abi Hatim al-Razi (died 327 AH/939 CE) and is no more than a collection of anecdotes, some of them fantastical. A biographical sketch was written by Zakarīya b. Yahya al-Sājī was later reproduced, but even then, a great deal of legend had already crept into the story of al-Shāfi‘i's life. The first real biography is by Ahmad Bayhaqi (died 458 AH/1066 CE) and is filled with what a modernist eye would qualify as pious legends. The following is what seems to be a sensible reading, according to a modern reductionist perspective.

Biography

Ancestry 
Al-Shāfi‘ī belonged to the Qurayshi clan of Banu Muttalib, which was the sister clan of the Banu Hashim, to which Muhammad SAW and the Abbasid caliphs belonged. This lineage may have given him prestige, arising from his belonging to the tribe of Muhammad, and his great-grandfather's kinship to him. However, al-Shāfi‘ī grew up in poverty, in spite of his connections in the highest social circles.

Early life 
He was born in Gaza by the town of Asqalan in 150 AH (767 CE). His father died in Ash-Sham while he was still a child. Fearing the waste of his sharīf lineage, his mother decided to move to Mecca when he was about two years old. Furthermore, his maternal family roots were from Yemen, and there were more members of his family in Mecca, where his mother believed he would better be taken care of. Little is known about al-Shāfi‘ī's early life in Mecca, except that he was brought up in poor circumstances and that from his youth he was devoted to learning. An account states that his mother could not afford to buy his paper, so he would write his lessons on bones, particularly shoulder-bones. He studied under Muslim ibn Khalid az-Zanji, the Mufti of Mecca then, who is thus considered to be the first teacher of Imam al-Shāfi‘ī. By the age of seven, al-Shāfi‘ī had memorised the Qur’an. At ten, he had committed Imam Malik's [[Muwatta Imam Malik|Muwatta''']] to heart, at which time his teacher would deputise him to teach in his absence. Al-Shāfi‘ī was authorised to issue fatwas at the age of fifteen.

 Apprenticeship under Imam Mālik 
Al-Shāfi‘ī moved to Al-Medinah in a desire for further legal training, as was the tradition of acquiring knowledge. Accounts differ on the age in which he set out to Medina; an account placed his age at thirteen, while another stated that he was in his twenties. There, he was taught for many years by the famous Imam Malik ibn Anas, who was impressed with his memory, knowledge and intelligence. By the time of Imam Mālik's death in 179 AH (795 CE), al-Shāfi‘ī had already gained a reputation as a brilliant jurist. Even though he would later disagree with some of the views of Imam Mālik, al-Shāfi‘ī accorded the deepest respect to him by always referring to him as "the Teacher".

 Yemeni Fitna 
At the age of thirty, al-Shāfi‘ī was appointed as the ‘Abbasid governor in the Yemeni city of Najran. He proved to be a just administrator but soon became entangled with factional jealousies. In 803 CE, al-Shāfi‘ī was accused of aiding the 'Alids in a revolt, and was thus summoned in chains with a number of 'Alids to the Caliph Harun ar-Rashid at Raqqa. Whilst other conspirators were put to death, al-Shafi'i's own eloquent defence convinced the Caliph to dismiss the charge. Other accounts state that the famous Hanafi jurist, Muḥammad ibn al-Ḥasan al-Shaybānī, was present at the court and defended al-Shāfi‘ī as a well-known student of the sacred law. What was certain was that the incident brought al-Shāfi‘ī in close contact with al-Shaybānī, who would soon become his teacher. It was also postulated that this incident impelled him to devote the rest of his career to legal studies, never again to seek government service.

 Apprenticeship under Al-Shaybānī, and exposure to Hanafī Jurists 
Al-Shāfi'ī travelled to Baghdad to study with Abu Hanifah's acolyte al-Shaybānī and others. It was here that he developed his first madh'hab, influenced by the teachings of both Imam Abu Hanifa and Imam Malik.  His work thus became known as "al Madhhab al Qadim lil Imam as Shafi’i," or the Old School of al-Shafi'i.

It was here that al-Shāfi'ī actively participated in legal arguments with the Hanafī jurists, strenuously defending the Mālikī school of thought. Some authorities stress the difficulties encountered by him in his arguments. Al-Shāfi'ī eventually left Baghdad for Mecca in 804 CE, possibly because of complaints by Hanafī followers to al-Shaybānī that al-Shafi'i had become somewhat critical of al-Shaybānī's position during their disputes. As a result, al-Shāfi'ī reportedly participated in a debate with al-Shaybānī over their differences, though who won the debate is disputed.

In Mecca, al-Shāfi'ī began to lecture at the Sacred Mosque, leaving a deep impression on many students of law, including the famous Hanbali jurist, Ahmad Ibn Hanbal. Al-Shāfi'ī's legal reasoning began to mature, as he started to appreciate the strength in the legal reasoning of the Hanafī jurists, and became aware of the weaknesses inherent in both the Mālikī and Hanafī schools of thought.

 Departure to Baghdad and Egypt 

Al-Shāfi'ī eventually returned to Baghdad in 810 CE. By this time, his stature as a jurist had grown sufficiently to permit him to establish an independent line of legal speculation. Caliph al-Ma'mun is said to have offered al-Shāfi'ī a position as a judge, but he declined the offer.

 Connection with the family of Muhammad 

In 814 CE, al-Shāfi'ī decided to leave Baghdad for Egypt. The precise reasons for his departure from Iraq are uncertain, but it was in Egypt that he would meet another tutor, Sayyida Nafisa bint Al-Hasan, who would also financially support his studies, and where he would dictate his life's works to students. Several of his leading disciples would write down what al-Shāfi'ī said, who would then have them read it back aloud so that corrections could be made. Al-Shāfi'ī biographers all agree that the legacy of works under his name are the result of those sessions with his disciples.

Nafisa was a descendant of Muhammad, through his grandson Hasan ibn Ali, who married another descendant of Muhammad, that is Ishaq al-Mu'tamin, the son of the Imam Ja'far al-Sadiq, who was reportedly a teacher of ash-Shafi'i's teacher Malik ibn Anas and Abu Hanifah. Thus all of the four great Imams of Sunni Fiqh (Abu Hanifah, Malik, his student Ash-Shafi'i, and his student Ibn Hanbal) are connected to Imam Ja'far from the Bayt (Household) of Muhammad, whether directly or indirectly.

 Death 

At least one authority states that al-Shāfi'ī died as a result of injuries sustained from an attack by supporters of a Maliki follower named Fityan. The story goes that al-Shāfi'ī triumphed in the argument over Fityan, who, being intemperate, resorted to abuse. The Governor of Egypt, with whom al-Shafi'i had good relations, ordered Fityan punished by having him paraded through the streets of the city carrying a plank and stating the reason for his punishment. Fityan's supporters were enraged by this treatment and attacked Shafi'i in retaliation after one of his lectures. Al-Shafi'i died a few days later. However, Ibn Hajar al-‘Asqalani in his biography of al-Shāfi'ī Tawālī al-Ta'sīs, casts doubt on this story saying "I do not consider this from a reliable source". However, al-Shāfi'ī was also known to have suffered from a serious intestinal illness/haemorrhoids, which kept him frail and ailing during the later years of his life. The precise cause of his death is thus unknown.

Al-Shāfi'ī died at the age of 54 on the 30th of Rajab in 204 AH (20 January 820 CE), in Al-Fustat, Egypt, and was buried in the vault of the Banū ‘Abd al-Hakam, near Mount al-Muqattam. The qubbah (dome) was built in 608 AH (1212 CE) by the Ayyubid Sultan Al-Kamil, and the mausoleum remains an important site today.

 Legacy 

Islam, Fiqh, Sunnah

Al-Shāfi'ī is credited with creating the essentials of the science of fiqh (the system of Islamic jurisprudence). He designated the four principles/sources/components of fiqh, which in order of importance are:
The Qur’an;
Hadith. i.e collections of the words, actions, and silent approval of Muhammad. (Together with the Qur'an these make up "revealed sources");
Ijma. i.e. the consensus of the (pure traditional) Muslim community;
Qiyas. i.e. the method of analogy.Snouck Hurgronje, C. Verspreide Geschriften. v.ii. 1923-7, page 286-315Margoliouth, D.S., The Early Development of Mohammedanism, 1914, page 65ff

Scholar John Burton goes farther, crediting Al-Shafi'i not just with establishing the science of fiqh in Islam, but its importance to the religion. "Where his contemporaries and their predecessors had engaged in defining Islam as a social and historical phenomenon, Shafi'i sought to define a revealed Law."

With this systematisation of shari'a, he provided a legacy of unity for all Muslims and forestalled the development of independent, regionally based legal systems.  The four Sunni legal schools or madhhabs keep their traditions within the framework that Shafi'i established.  One of the schools – Shafi'i fiqh – is named for Al-Shāfi‘ī.  It is followed in many different places in the Islamic world: Indonesia, Malaysia, Egypt, Ethiopia, Somalia, Yemen, west of Iran, as well as Sri Lanka and southern parts of India, especially in the Malabar coast of North Kerala and Canara region of Karnataka.

Al-Shāfi‘ī emphasised the final authority of a hadith of Muhammad  so that even the Qur'an was "to be interpreted in the light of traditions (i.e. hadith), and not vice versa." While traditionally the Quran is considered above the Sunna in authority, Al-Shafi'i "forcefully argued"  that the sunna stands "on equal footing with the Quran", (according to scholar Daniel Brown) for – as Al-Shafi'i put it – "the command of the Prophet is the command of Almighty Allah."

Al-Shāfi‘ī
"insists time after time that nothing can override the authority of the Prophet, even if it be attested only by an isolate tradition, and that every well-authenticated tradition going back to the Prophet has precedence over the opinions of his Companions, their Successors, and later authorities."
The focus by the Muslim community on ahadith of Muhammad and disinterest in ahadith of Muhammad's companions (whose ahadith were commonly used before Al-Shāfi‘ī since most of whom survived him and spread his teachings after his death) is thought (by scholar Joseph Schacht) to reflect the success of Al-Shāfi‘ī's doctrine.

Al-Shāfi‘ī influence was such that he changed the use of the term Sunnah,  "until it invariably meant only the Sunnah of the Prophet" (according to John Burton this was his "principle achievement"). While earlier, sunnah had been used to refer to tribal manners and customs, (and while Al-Shāfi‘ī distinguished between the non-authoritative "sunnah of the Muslims" that was followed in practice, and the "sunnah of the Prophet" that Muslims should follow), sunnah came to mean the Sunnah of Muhammad.

In the Islamic sciences, Burton credits him with "the imposition of a formal theoretical distinction" between `the Sunnah of the Prophet` and the Quran, "especially where the two fundamental sources appeared to clash".

 Kalam

Al-Shafi'i was part of those early traditionalist theologians who strongly opposed Kalam and criticised the speculative theologians for abandoning the Qur'an and Sunnah through their adoption of Kalam.

Structures
Saladin built a madrassah and a shrine on the site of his tomb. Saladin's brother Afdal built a mausoleum for him in 1211 after the defeat of the Fatimids. It remains a site where people petition for justice.
Followers
Among the followers of Imam al-Shāfi‘ī's school were:
Bayhaqi
Al-Suyuti
Al-Dhahabi
Al-Ghazali
Ibn Hajar Asqalani
Ibn Kathir
Yahya ibn Sharaf al-Nawawi
Al-Mawardi
 Al Muzani

 Works 
He authored more than 100 books. But most them have not reached us. The extant works of his which are accessible today are:

Al-Risala – The best-known book by al-Shafi'i in which he examined principles of jurisprudence. The book has been translated into English.
Kitab al-Umm – his main surviving text on Shafi'i fiqh
Musnad al-Shafi'i (on hadith) – it is available with arrangement, Arabic 'Tartib', by Ahmad ibn Abd ar-Rahman al-Banna
Ikhtilaf al Hadith
Al sunan al Ma’thour
Jma’ al ilm
In addition to this, al-Shafi'i was an eloquent poet, who composed many short poems aimed at addressing morals and behaviour.

 Anecdotal stories 
Many stories are told about the childhood and life of al-Shafi'i, and it is difficult to separate truth from myth:

Tradition says that he memorised the Qur’an at the age of seven; by ten, he had memorised the Muwatta of Malik ibn Anas; he was a mufti (given authorization to issue fatwa) at the age of fifteen. He recited the Qur'an every day in prayer, and twice a day in Ramadan. Some apocryphal accounts claim he was very handsome, that his beard did not exceed the length of his fist, and that it was very black. He wore a ring that was inscribed with the words, "Allah suffices Muhammad ibn Idris as a reliance." He was also known to be very generous.

He was also an accomplished archer, a poet and some accounts call him the most eloquent of his time.  Some accounts claim that there was a group of Bedouin who would come and sit to listen to him, not for the sake of learning, but just to listen to his eloquent use of the language. Even in later eras, his speeches and works were used by Arabic grammarians. He was given the title of Nasir al-Sunnah, the Defender of the Sunnah.

Al-Shafi‘i loved the Islamic prophet Muhammad very deeply. Al Muzani said of him, "He said in the Old School: ‘Supplication ends with the invocation of blessings on the Prophet, and its end is but by means of it.’" Al-Karabisi said: "I heard al-Shafi’i say that he disliked for someone to say ‘the Messenger’ (al-Rasul), but that he should say ‘Allah’s Messenger’ (Rasul Allah) out of veneration for him." He divided his night into three parts: one for writing, one for praying, and one for sleeping.

Apocryphal accounts claim that Imam Ahmad said of al-Shafi'i, "I never saw anyone adhere more to hadith than al-Shafi’i. No one preceded him in writing down the hadith in a book." Imam Ahmad is also claimed to have said, "Not one of the scholars of hadith touched an inkwell nor a pen except he owed a huge debt to al-Shafi’i."

Ahmad Ibn Hanbal considered al-Shafi'i as the "Imam most faithful to tradition" who led the people of tradition to victory against the exponents of ra'y. In the words of Ibn Hanbal, "at no time was there anyone of importance in learning who erred less, and who followed more closely the sunnah of the Prophet than al-Shafi'i."

Muhammad al-Shaybani said, "If the scholars of hadith speak, it is in the language of al-Shafi’i."

 stated:

According to many accounts, he was said to have a photographic memory. One anecdote states that he would always cover one side of a book while reading because a casual glance at the other page would commit it to memory.

He claimed that the game of chess was an image of war, and it was possible to play chess as a mental exercise for the solution of military tactics.  Chess could not be played for a stake, but if a player was playing for a mental exercise, he was not doing anything illegal.  Provided the player took care that his fondness for chess did not cause him to break any other rule of life, he saw no harm in playing chess.  He played chess himself, defending his practice by the example of many of his companions. 

 Quotations 
 He who seeks pearls immerses himself in the sea.
 He said to the effect that no knowledge of Islam can be gained from books of Kalam, as kalam "is not from knowledge"Dhahabi, as-Siyar (10/30) and that "It is better for a man to spend his whole life doing whatever Allah has prohibited – besides shirk with Allah – rather than spending his whole life involved in kalam."
 Ahadith from the Islamic prophet Muhammad have to be accepted without questioning, reasoning, critical thinking. "If a hadith is authenticated as coming from the Prophet, we have to resign ourselves to it, and your talk and the talk of others about why and how, is a mistake..."

 Islamic scholars 

 See also 

Fiqh
Mujaddid
Shafi'i
Mausoleum of Imam al-Shafi'i

 References 
Citations

Notes

 
 Ruthven Malise, Islam in the World''. 3rd edition Granta Books London 2006 ch. 4
 Majid Khadduri (trans.), "al-Shafi'i's Risala: Treatise on the Foundation of Islamic Jurisprudence". Islamic Texts Society 1961, reprinted 1997. .
 al-Shafi'i, Muhammad b. Idris,"The Book of the Amalgamation of Knowledge" translated by Aisha Y. Musa in Hadith as Scripture: Discussions on The Authority Of Prophetic Traditions in Islam, New York: Palgrave, 2008
Helal M Abu Taher, Char Imam(Four Imams), Islamic Foundation, Dhaka,1980.

External links 

 Biodata at MuslimScholars.info
 The Biography of Imam ash-Shafi'i
 The Life of Imam al-Shafi'i at Lost Islamic History
 Short Biography of Imam Shafi'i
 Concise Summary of Imam Shafi'i
Diagram of teachers and students of Imam Shafi'i
 The Mausoleum of Imam al-Shafi'i

767 births
820 deaths
8th-century Arabic writers
9th-century Arabic writers
9th-century clergy
9th-century Muslim scholars of Islam
8th-century jurists
9th-century jurists
Scholars from the Abbasid Caliphate
Maliki fiqh scholars
Mujaddid
People from Gaza City
Shafi'is
Sunni fiqh scholars
Sunni imams
Sunni Muslim scholars of Islam
8th-century Arabs
9th-century Arabs

ace:Syafi'iy